The 1982 SMU Mustangs football team represented the Southern Methodist University in the 1982 NCAA Division I-A football season. It was the first year for the team under head coach Bobby Collins and the Mustangs finished undefeated  and were Southwest Conference champions 

A tie in their regular season finale against No. 9 Arkansas on November 20 caused the voters in both polls to drop SMU from second to  costing the Mustangs the national championship. The tie was attributed in part to a lengthy and highly questionable pass interference call on Arkansas late in the game that allowed SMU to score the game-tying  a call that announcer Keith Jackson stated on air was a bad call by the officials. Trailing by a point, head coach Collins opted not to go for the two-point conversion and the lead, and they kicked the extra point to knot the score at seventeen with under three minutes remaining. There was no further scoring, as SMU missed a long field goal attempt in the 

Repeating as SWC champions, the Mustangs earned the automatic bid to the Cotton Bowl on New Year's Day, where they defeated sixth-ranked Pittsburgh  Played in near-freezing conditions, it was the final college game for the "Pony Express" running back tandem of Eric Dickerson and Craig James, as well as for Pitt quarterback 

After SMU's tie to Arkansas, Penn State moved up to second and then defeated No. 1 Georgia in the Sugar Bowl to secure the top spot in the AP Poll and the Coaches Poll, despite a slightly less impressive final record 

The Mustangs were runner-up in the final AP Poll, but the Helms Athletic Foundation, in the final year in which it selected a national college football champion, split the honor between SMU and Penn State. On the season, the Mustangs outscored their opponents by a combined score of 354 to 160.

Schedule

Roster

Rankings

Game summaries

Tulane

SMU romped to a season-opening victory over Tulane with a school-record 519 yards rushing. Senior Eric Dickerson ran for 183 yards and two touchdowns, and went over 3,000 career rushing yards. Craig James added 110 yards and a touchdown. It was the 10th time Dickerson and James each ran for more than 100 yards in the same game.

at UTEP

TCU

In the Battle for the Iron Skillet, SMU beat TCU 16–13.

North Texas State

at Baylor

Houston

at Texas

Texas A&M

Eric Dickerson ran for over 200 yards and 3 touchdowns on 14 carries.

at Rice

In the Mayor's Cup, SMU beat Rice 41–14.

at Texas Tech

Arkansas
Going into this game, SMU needed a victory or a tie to claim the SWC championship and secure a trip to the Cotton Bowl. Arkansas, on the other hand, needed a victory over the Mustangs plus a win over Texas the following week. The game proved to be marred by controversy due to questionable officiating.

Late in the fourth quarter Arkansas led SMU 17-10 with time winding down. From the Mustang 43 yard line, SMU quarterback Lance McIlhenny lofted a pass to receiver Jackie Wilson down the left sideline, with Wilson being defended by Arkansas cornerback Nathan Jones. The pass was long, and Jones was in fact in front of Wilson as both players went to the turf together. Jones was flagged for pass interference, and since that penalty was a spot foul instead of 15 yards at that time in college football, the ball was placed near the Arkansas 15 yard line. SMU would score the game-tying touchdown a few plays later, and the game ended in a 17-17 tie, handing the Mustangs the conference championship. Play-by-play announcer Keith Jackson would even say on live television that the pass interference penalty on Jones was "just a terrible call". The officiating crew was suspended after this game and the NCAA issued an apology to Arkansas. This egregious call directly influenced the NCAA to change the rules for pass interference over the following summer so that a pass interference penalty would be 15 yards and not a spot foul.

vs. Pittsburgh (Cotton Bowl)

Awards and honors
Eric Dickerson, consensus All-American, third in the Heisman Trophy voting, despite splitting time with

NFL Draft
Six Mustangs were selected in the 1983 NFL Draft, which lasted twelve rounds (335 selections).

References

SMU
SMU Mustangs football seasons
Southwest Conference football champion seasons
Cotton Bowl Classic champion seasons
College football undefeated seasons
SMU Mustangs football